Alacrima refers to an abnormality in tear production that could mean reduced tear production or absent tear production.  Because a lack of tears presents in only in a few rare disorders, it aids in diagnosis of these disorders, including Triple-A syndrome and NGLY1 deficiency.

Alacrima can be formally diagnosed through a Schirmer's test.

References

External links 

Disorders of conjunctiva